Arcachon is a commune in the southwestern French department of Gironde. It has a sandy beach and a mild climate said to be favourable for invalids suffering from pulmonary complaints.
Arcachon is twinned with five cities.

History

On 2 May 1857, Emperor Napoleon III signed an imperial decree declaring that Arcachon was now an autonomous municipality; coincidentally, the railway line extension from Bordeaux to Arcachon had been completed that same year. At that time, Arcachon was scarcely more than a forest of pine trees, oaks and strawberry trees (arbutus), with no road links and few real houses, with a population fewer than 400 people, mostly fishermen and peasants. In earlier years, when some hygienists began to recommend sea bathing, three sea establishments were laid out by investors to attract the Bordeaux bourgeoisie and other wealthy people. This was the beginning of a new lifestyle, and some of the locals got the opportunity to claim their independence from La Teste-de-Buch, which owned their properties, in order to found a "free" new town, Arcachon. Until 1950, tuberculosis patients also visited Arcachon for fresh-air treatments. 

Arcachon is known for the "Arcachonnaise", the local name for an Arcachon villa, the architectural style of many of the older houses built there in the nineteenth century.

The United States Navy established a naval air station on 8 June 1918 to operate seaplanes during World War I. The base closed shortly after the First Armistice at Compiègne.

Population
The historic populations of Arcachon from 1861 until 2017 are shown in the table below.

Geography
Arcachon is one of the largest towns within the Landes forest, alongside Arcachon, Dax, and Mont-de-Marsan. The bay provides excellent conditions for growing oysters and around 175 hectares of the bay is dedicated to oyster farming.

The city enjoys a mild climate thanks to the Gulf Stream, a warm and swift Atlantic ocean current originating from the gulf of Mexico.

Transport
The nearest airport is Bordeaux–Mérignac Airport. Arcachon station is daily served by the TER Nouvelle-Aquitaine trains from Bordeaux and also by the TGV Atlantique from Paris on weekends. Public transportation is operated by buses. Boat excursions around Arcachon Bay are provided for tourism, and boat shuttles offer transport to Cap ferret, Dune du palat, Le Canon, Le Moulleau, Andernos and Banc D'Arguin.

People 
 Humbert Balsan - film producer, was born in Arcachon in 1954. 
 Carmen Bernos de Gasztold - poet, was born in Arcachon in 1919.  
 Sylvie Caster writer and journalist, was born in Arcachon in 1952.
 Alexandre Dumas - writer, once lived in Arcachon's Ville d'Hiver.  
 Ramón Emeterio Betances - Puerto Rican politician, spent close to six months at Arcachon shortly before his death in 1898.
 Jean Périsson - composer, was born here in 1924 
 Louise Talma - composer, was born here in 1906.
 Charles Tournemire - composer-organist, died here in 1939. 

On the other side of the Bassin d'Arcachon is Cap Ferret, a popular resort for celebrities including Zinedine Zidane and Jean Pierre Pernaut, who have holiday homes.

Twin towns – sister cities

Arcachon is twinned with: 
 Aveiro, Portugal
 Gardone Riviera, Italy
 Goslar, Germany
 Pescara, Italy
 Amherst, Massachusetts, United States

See also
Dune du Pilat
Communes of the Gironde department
Château Deganne
Our Lady of Arcachon
Statue of Heracles, Arcachon

References

External links

 Official web site
 Dune du Pyla site
 Arcachon web site
 Aerial view of the Dune du Pilat
 Air photography of Arcachon
 Live Camera Arcachon

Communes of Gironde
Subprefectures in France
Port cities and towns on the French Atlantic coast